Yngve Eilert "Garvis" Määttä (22 September 1935 – 7 May 2011) was a Swedish professional ice hockey player and coach. He played for Skellefteå AIK and Södertälje SK. In international play he scored the game tying 4–4 goal in the 1957 World Ice Hockey Championships in the final game against the Soviet Union that clinched the tournament win for Sweden.

Määttä was the coach for Huddinge IK in division 1 during the 1974–75 and 1975–76 seasons, and for Djurgårdens IF during the 1978–79 Elitserien season.

References

External links

1935 births
2011 deaths
People from Kiruna Municipality
Olympic ice hockey players of Sweden
Ice hockey players at the 1964 Winter Olympics
Medalists at the 1964 Winter Olympics
Olympic medalists in ice hockey
Olympic silver medalists for Sweden
Skellefteå AIK players
Södertälje SK players
Swedish ice hockey coaches
Swedish ice hockey forwards
Sportspeople from Norrbotten County
Djurgårdens IF Hockey coaches